Hellyer Park Velodrome is a velodrome in Hellyer County Park at San Jose, California, United States. It is a  track with turns at a maximum banking of 23 degrees built in 1963. It is located next to the Coyote Creek Trail and considered part of the county's Coyote Creek Parkway chain of parks along the creek.

In 1972, the Hellyer Velodrome hosted the US Olympic Bicycling Trials.

The velodrome is operated by the Northern California Velodrome Association (NCVA), a 501(c)3 non-profit corporation.

See also
 Cycling in San Jose, California

References

External links
 
 "They aren't big wheels / San Jose velodrome features low key bicycle racing" by SFGate, 2004-08-19

Cycling in San Jose, California
Velodromes in California